Interscholastic athletics at Baltimore City College date back over 120 years. Though varsity sports were not formally organized until 1895, interscholastic athletics became a fixture at the school earlier in the 19th century. In the late-1890s, City competed in the Maryland Intercollegiate Football Association (MIFA), a nine-member league consisting of colleges in Washington, D.C. and Maryland. City College was the lone secondary school among MIFA membership. The 1895 football schedule included St. John's College, Swarthmore College, the United States Naval Academy, University of Maryland, and Washington College. Between 1894 and 1920, City College regularly faced off against the Johns Hopkins Blue Jays and the Navy Midshipmen in lacrosse.

Baltimore City College began competing against other secondary schools in 1919 when it was invited to join the Maryland Scholastic Association (MSA) as a founding member. After 75 years of governing Baltimore-metro area boys' high school athletics, the Maryland Scholastic Association dissolved in 1993 when its 15 public school members, including City College, withdrew from the league to join the Maryland Public Secondary Schools Athletic Association (MPSSAA). The Knights currently compete with other public secondary schools in the MPSSAA (Class 3A, North Region, District 9), more commonly referred to as the Baltimore City League (Division 1), but routinely schedule contests against area private schools in various sports.

The current City College varsity athletic program consists of 18 sports: six for boys, eight for girls, and five coeducational teams. The boys' sports includes baseball, basketball, football, lacrosse, soccer, and wrestling. The girls' sports are badminton, basketball, lacrosse, field hockey, soccer, softball, and volleyball. The five co-ed sports are cross country, indoor track and field, swimming, outdoor track and field, and tennis. Girls' sports were added to City's athletic department in the fall of 1978 when the school became coeducational for the first time in its then-139-year-old history.

The school's athletic teams are currently outfitted by Under Armour.

Championships 

Baltimore City College's championship pedigree predates World War I. Since winning its first championships (baseball and ice hockey) in 1903, the Knights' athletic success has spanned every sport offered by the school. Though it no longer sponsors bowling, fencing, golf, and ice hockey, City has won titles in 20 different sports in its history.

The list below includes championships won in single-sport leagues before the school joined an athletic association in all sports in 1919, championships earned between 1919 and 1993 as members of the Maryland Scholastic Association (now Maryland Interscholastic Athletic Association), and Maryland Public Secondary Schools Athletic Association (MPSSAA) district, regional, and state championships won by the Knights since joining the MPSSAA in 1993.

Badminton (17 championships)
 Pre-MPSSAA Championships — 1990–92
 MPSSAA District Championships — 1993, 1995–97, 2004–09, 2011–14

Baseball (14)
 Pre-MSA Championships — 1903, 1915
 MSA Championships — 1926, 1934–38, 1940, 1942, 1962
 MPSSAA District Championships — 1994, 2017, 2019

Boys' basketball (25)
 Pre-MSA Championships — 1916
 MSA Championships — 1922–23, 1934–35, 1938–40, 1961, 1963, 1965–67, 1969
 MPSSAA State Championships — 2009, 2010, 2014
 MPSSAA Regional Championships — 1997–99, 2009–10, 2014, 2022
 MPSSAA District Championships — 2014

Girls' basketball (4)
 MPSSAA State Championships — 2009 
 MPSSAA Regional Championships — 2004, 2005, 2009

Bocce (2)
 MPSSAA District Championships — 2013, 2014

Boys' bowling (7)
 MSA Championships — 1938, 1944, 1945, 1946, 1948, 1949, 1954

Boys' cross country (20)
 MSA Championships — 1936–37, 1939, 1941, 1943, 1950, 1955, 1958, 1960–69, 1983, 1989

Fencing (11) 
 MSA Championships — 1930, 1932, 1936, 1938, 1940, 1947, 1949, 1951, 1954–56

Football (25) 
 MSA Championships — 1937–42, 1961, 1964–68, 1986–88, 1991–92
 MPSSAA Regional Championships — 1996, 2005, 2006

Boys' golf (10) 
 MSA Championships — 1935, 1940–42, 1944, 1954–57, 1960

Ice hockey (2) 
 Pre-MSA Championships — 1903
 MSA Championships — 1941

Boys' lacrosse (19) 
 MSA Championships — 1933–35, 1941, 1955, 1957–62, 1984, 1987
 MPSSAA District Championships — 1993, 2008–10, 2015, 2019

Girls' lacrosse (12)
 MPSSAA District Championships — 1998, 1999, 2000, 2009, 2011, 2013, 2014, 2015, 2016, 2017, 2018, 2019

Boys' soccer (14) 
 MSA Championships — 1934, 1935, 1938, 1939, 1941, 1963, 1982, 1985, 1986, 1987
 MPSSAA Regional Championships — 2018
 MPSSAA District Championships — 1994, 2018, 2019

Girls' soccer (3)
 MPSSAA District Championships — 2000, 2012, 2013

Softball (2) 
 MPSSAA District Championships — 1994, 1996

Swimming (35)
 MSA Championships — 1930–42, 1943–44, 1946–47, 1949–53, 1986–90
 MPSSAA District Championships — 2007–08, 2010–2013, 2019

Boys' tennis (14) 
 MSA Championships — 1923, 1925–27, 1929, 1933, 1935, 1944, 1946, 1954, 1958, 1959, 1961, 1988

Co-ed tennis (6)
 MPSSAA District Championships — 1990, 1991, 1992, 2007–09, 2011

Boys' track and field (22)
 MSA Championships — 1903, 1906, 1936, 1939, 1941, 1956–67, 1969, 1986–87
 MPSSAA Regional Championships — 1997

Volleyball (4) 
 Pre-MPSSAA Championships — 1980, 1982
 MPSSAA District Championships — 1996, 2010

Wrestling (15)
 MSA Championship — 1923, 1938, 1940, 1942, 1956, 1963–64, 1967–70, 1973, 1975–76
 MPSSAA District Championships – 2008

Boys' basketball 

Basketball has been played at Baltimore City College for more than a century. One of the earliest recorded results in program history is a one-point overtime road loss to the University of Maryland Terrapins (then known as the Maryland Agricultural College Aggies) on January 25, 1913. The most successful head coach in school history was George Howard "Jerry" Phipps, who led the Knights to a record of 133–27, four Maryland Scholastic Association (MSA) championships, and a streak of forty straight games without a loss spanning two seasons between 1960 and 1968. In all, the school won twelve MSA A-Conference basketball championships (1922, 1923, 1934, 1935, 1938, 1939, 1940, 1961, 1963, 1965, 1966, 1967, 1969).

Baltimore City College currently competes in District 9 (Baltimore City League) of the MPSSAA. Since 2007, City College has earned berths in every MPSSAA state tournament and has posted seven 20+ win seasons. The Knights have won three MPSSAA state championships (2009, 2010, and 2014), one of just five schools in Maryland that have won three or more boys' basketball state titles since 2000.
City has advanced to the MPSSAA state tournament semifinals six times (1997, 1998, 1999, 2009, 2010, and 2014), third most all-time among Baltimore City League teams. The Knights won the Baltimore City League Division I championship in 2014 and also appeared in the district championship game in 2011.

With a record of 27–0 in 2014, City College posted the third undefeated season in school history (1966, 1967) and became the first Baltimore City League team since 2008–2009 to finish the season without a loss. The Knights ended the 2014 season as the No. 18-ranked team in the country in the final USA Today Super 25 and Student Sports Fab 50 national boys' basketball polls, the team's highest national ranking since beginning the 2011–12 season as the No. 21-ranked team in the preseason USA Today national poll.

Daryl Wade, who coached the Knights to the 2014 MPSSAA state championship, three additional MPSSAA state semifinal appearances, and a 30-game win streak between December 2013 and December 2014, was replaced as head coach in 2017. The current City College head coach is Omarr Smith, B.C.C. '98, a long-time Wade assistant.

Football 

The Baltimore City College football program began in the mid-1870s, and has won more than 20 MSA A-Conference and MPSSAA championships in its history. The Knights primarily competed against are colleges and universities throughout the 1880s and 1890s because few secondary schools existed at the time. The program began competing against other high schools at the beginning of the 20th century, and has held since 1941 the record for the longest streak of games played without a loss in MSA and MPSSAA history. The Knights played 54 consecutive games without a loss between 1934 and 1941. Harry Lawrence, who guided the Knights to a 38-game undefeated streak between 1936 and 1940 (including 35 wins, three ties, and four MSA championships), remains City College's most successful head football coach.

George Young became head football coach in 1959 and guided the Knights to six Maryland Scholastic Association A-Conference championships. Young left the program after the 1967 season to join the National Football League as an offensive line coach for the Baltimore Colts and would later become the general manager of the New York Giants. One of his star players was quarterback Kurt Schmoke, who later became States' Attorney for Baltimore City and served two terms as the Mayor of Baltimore, the first elected African-American mayor in the history of Baltimore City.

George Petrides was named head football coach in 1975 and remained in the same position for 40 years. Petrides, a 1967 graduate of the school, retired in 2015 with a coaching record of 257–144–1 and as the second winningest active coach in Maryland high school football. During his tenure, City had a 29-game winning streak en route to two Maryland Scholastic Association A-Conference championships in 1991 and 1992. Coach Petrides guided City College to appearances in the semifinals of the MPSSAA state football playoffs in 1996, 2001, and 2005. The Knights finished the 1987 and 1992 seasons ranked in the top-20 nationally in the USA Today high school football poll.

City–Poly rivalry (1889–present) 

The City-Poly football rivalry is the oldest American football rivalry in Maryland, and one of the oldest public school football rivalries in the United States. The rivalry began in 1889, when City College met the Baltimore Polytechnic Institute (Poly) at Clifton Park for a football scrimmage in which City's freshman team beat Poly. City remained undefeated in the series until 1908. In the 1920s, the rivalry turned so fierce that riots erupted on the streets of downtown Baltimore on the day before "The Game" when opposing parades clashed resulting in the sons of both the Mayor of Baltimore and the Governor of Maryland were arrested in 1928. By the 1930s a "Peace Pact" was sworn annually and signed by student government leaders of both schools before the cameras of the press in the Mayor's Ceremonial Office in City Hall. Several student disturbances at games or on transit buses afterwards in the late-1960s and early-1970s threatened to put an end to the athletic tradition reflecting the tense tenor of the times, but goodwill eventually prevailed again by the quieter 1980s. By the 1950s, it had become a Baltimore tradition that after a morning of church services, parades and rallies, the two Catholic high school football powers of Loyola High School (Loyola Blakefield) and Calvert Hall College would play on Thanksgiving Day morning at 10 a.m., followed at 2 p.m. by City-Poly as the two public school rivals at Memorial Stadium on 33rd Street. That evening's TV news and sports casts led off with the scores and highlights of "The Game" and half-time shows and parades. Next day's The Sun and The News-Post and American had special sections and stories covering all facets of the day before.

One of the most memorable City-Poly games occurred on Thanksgiving Day 1965, at Baltimore's Memorial Stadium, with some 25,000 fans in attendance. City beat Poly 52–6, and completed a 10–0 season with the team finishing the season ranked eighth in the nation by a national sports poll. City's 52–6 victory over Poly in that game is the largest margin of victory in the history of the series. Former Baltimore Mayor Kurt Schmoke was the quarterback and Maryland Delegate Curt Anderson was the captain. The game is no longer played on Thanksgiving or at Memorial Stadium, but is now located at the home of the Baltimore Ravens, M&T Bank Stadium, at Camden Yards in downtown Baltimore. City College won the 127th meeting in 2015 by routing Poly by a final score of 42–6, the school's fourth consecutive victory in the series. Poly now leads the series 62–59–6.

References

Baltimore City College
High school sports in the United States